The 2015 McDonald's All-American Girls Game is an All-Star basketball game that was played on April 1, 2015, at the United Center in Chicago, Illinois, home of the Chicago Bulls. The game's rosters featured the best and most highly recruited high school girls graduating in 2015.  The game is the 14th annual version of the McDonald's All-American Game first played in 2002.

2015 Game
The 2015 game was a game of runs. The West jumped out to a huge lead, then the East roared back and took over and made it a close game the rest of the way. The West team started the game on a 16–4 run by buckets from Te'a Cooper and Katie Lou Samuelson, but the East flipped the switch using Marina Mabrey, Asia Durr, and Taylor Murray to lead their charge. The East lead 81=69 with just under 3 minutes left in the game, but the West made one last charge and got it to 3 points from a Samuelson 3-pointer with 32.7 seconds left. Durr made a couple of free throws with 6.1 seconds left to seal the victory for the East.

This was the highest scoring girls' game in the 14-year history.

Rosters

2015 East Roster

2015 West Roster

Coaches
The East team was coached by:
 Head Coach — John Hutchcraft of Guy-Perkins High School (Guy, Arkansas)

The West team was coached by:
 Head Coach - Emery Roy of Rocky Mountain High School (Meridian, Idaho)

Game

See also
2015 McDonald's All-American Boys Game

References

External links
McDonald's All-American on the web

2015 in American women's basketball
2015